Tamri Pkhakadze (born 28 July 1957) is a Georgian writer, playwright, children's author and translator.

Biography 
Tamri Pkhakadze was born in Tbilisi, Georgia. She graduated from Tbilisi State University in 1979 as a philologist. She has a PhD in philology.

1980-2006 she worked in the Old Georgian Literature department at the Shota Rustaveli Institute of Georgian Literature. In 2011 she has been working for the publishing house "Triasi" as editor in chief.

She has published novels, collections of prose, plays and children’s books. Several children’s songs have been composed to her verses. Quite a few of her works have been staged in various theatres, among them Kitchen Gardening in a War Zone, which has been performed in four different cities.

Books

 Stop, Kira, Stop!, Palitra L Publishing, 2022, 
 Long-nosed Sorcerer Marcia, King Chubby the First and Others, Bakur Sulakauri Publishing, 2016, 
 Hymn of Alphabet, Palitra L Publishing, 2012
 Three Tales for New Year, Publishing House Triasi,
 Digits in Motion, Palitra L Publishing, 2012
 A Merry Train, Palitra L Publishing, 2012
 The Adventure of Globus and Luka, Pegasi Publishing, 2011, 
 Gio in Africa, Palitra L Publishing, 2011,  
 Three Under the Sun, Palitra L Publishing, 2011, 
 Kitchen Gardening in a War Zone, Shemecneba Publishing, 2010, 
 Khachapuri, Palitra L Publishing, 2010
 CV, Shemecneba Publishing, 2009, 
 Three of Us and the Angel, Bakur Sulakauri Publishing, 2007, 
 Flying, Publishing House Abuli, 2007, 
 Passions, Palitra L Publishing, 2006
 My Faraway I, Diogene Publishing House, 2005
 Until We are Summoned, Diogene Publishing House, 2003

Translations
 Dina Rubina — Petrushka's Syndrome, Tbilisi, Palitra L Publishing, 2017,

Prizes and awards
 Nominated for Astrid Lindgren Memorial Award 2015 for work dedicated to children
 "Literary Palette" magazine Prize of 2005 for the story Kitchen Gardening in a War Zone
 Literary Award SABA 2004 in the category The best Debut for the collection Until We are Summoned
 Winner of Kvali association competition in 2003 for the story A Two-Faced Day

References

External links 
 PKHAKADZE TAMRI
 Tamribooks
 Tamri Pkhakadze to Meet with Schoolchildren at the National Library

Writers from Georgia (country)
Writers from Tbilisi
Women poets from Georgia (country)
1957 births
Tbilisi State University alumni
Living people
Novelists from Georgia (country)
Dramatists and playwrights from Georgia (country)
Screenwriters from Georgia (country)
Translators from Georgia (country)
Philologists from Georgia (country)
20th-century women writers from Georgia (country)
21st-century women writers from Georgia (country)
Postmodern writers
Magic realism writers
20th-century dramatists and playwrights from Georgia (country)
21st-century dramatists and playwrights from Georgia (country)